Micronesian kingfisher is a common name used to refer to several species of bird of the genus Todiramphus found in neighboring island countries of the western Pacific Ocean.

 Guam kingfisher, 	Todiramphus cinnamominus
 Pohnpei kingfisher,  Todiramphus reichenbachii
 Rusty-capped kingfisher,  Todiramphus pelewensis

Birds by common name